Uwe Rathjen (28 June 1943 – 14 November 2019)  was a West German former handball player who competed in the 1972 Summer Olympics.

In 1972 he was part of the West German team which finished sixth in the Olympic tournament. He played four matches as goalkeeper.

References

External links
sports-reference.com

1943 births
2019 deaths
German male handball players
Olympic handball players of West Germany
Handball players at the 1972 Summer Olympics